The Marquette Underwater Preserve was established in 1990 to promote conservation of the submerged historical resources in Lake Superior near Marquette, Michigan. The Preserve is composed of two separate units, the Marquette Unit and the Huron Islands Unit. The Marquette Unit extends along approximately 24 miles of Michigan shoreline out to the 200-foot depth contour. The Huron Islands Unit surrounds a group of granite peaks about 12 miles from shore. The Michigan Underwater Preserve Council oversees activities relating to all of Michigan's Underwater Preserves.

The preserve is open to scuba divers.

History 
Marquette, Michigan became a major shipping port after iron ore was discovered in the area in 1844, and marine traffic in the area has been heavy ever since. Heavy traffic combined with not-too-uncommon thick fog and gale force winds has resulted in numerous shipwrecks.

See also
Michigan Underwater Preserves

References

External links
Page with extensive description

Lists of coordinates
Marine parks of Michigan
Protected areas of Marquette County, Michigan